The Battle of Debecka Pass (Dibagah, Dibege, دیبه‌گه) on 6–7 April 2003, sometimes known as the Battle of Debecka Ridge or Debecka Crossroads, or otherwise referred to as the Alamo of the Iraq War, was a successful operation launched by U.S. Special Forces to secure a major crossroads near the village of Debecka (Dibege, دیبه‌گه in Kurdish), between Mosul and Kirkuk in northern Iraq. It was notable for its use of the Raytheon/Lockheed-Martin Javelin anti-tank missile. The weapon demonstrated how lethal and crucial technology can be in determining the outcome of a battle.  The light unarmored SOF and Peshmerga (KDP) force faced a mechanized force of Iraqi infantry and tanks.  The numerically inferior US and KPD force was able to defeat the Iraqi mechanized infantry & tank force with combined air-to-ground strikes, superior maneuvering, and the use of the Javelin missiles.

Objective
The 26 United States Army Special Forces Green Berets were divided into two A-teams; ODA 391 and ODA 392, from the 3rd SFG, were equipped with GMVs (Ground Mobility Vehicles)-modified Humvees with .50 caliber HMGs and Mark 19 grenade launchers that could travel a thousand miles without resupply. the ODAs conducted battle training in Fort Bragg, North Carolina, and Fort Pickett, Virginia between October and December 2002, On 8 March 2003, the ODAs flew from Pope Air Force Base to Romania and on 26 March 2003 they infiltrated northern Iraq via an MC-130 Combat Talon landing at Al-Sulaymaniya, some 60 miles east of Kirkuk. In their first few days in Iraq, they participated in Operation Viking Hammer. On 1 April 2003, they moved to Irbil and onto a staging area where they linked up with ODA 044, 10th SFG, and their Peshmerga allies. On 4 April 2003, they were given a new mission, code-named Northern Safari.

On 6 April 2003, the 26 Green Berets were given the task to capture a strategically important junction between Mosul and Kirkuk, near the village of Debecka (Dibege, دیبه‌گه in Kurdish). Were it captured, it would sever Highway 2 and impede Iraqi movement in the north, as well as provide a springboard to eventually drive on and capture the important Kirkuk oil fields. They were to seize the Debecka intersection until relieved by the 173rd Airborne Brigade's artillery component.

The battle
On the eighteenth day of the U.S.-led invasion of Iraq, U.S. special forces moved in for the attack. The battle began with an aerial bombardment from B-52 bombers. Green Berets from ODA 044 with 150 Peshmerga fighters advanced towards Objective Rock - a T junction leading to the crossroads and the town of Debecka. ODA 391 and 392 would provide fire support for supported ODA 044 and the Peshmerga, to their immediate north two groups of 500 Peshmerga fighters advanced on the ridgeline; further North, ODA 043, with 150 Kurds, supported by ODAs 394 and 395 acting as fire support attacked Objective Stone - a commanding hilltop occupied by Iraqi forces. 

The central column of 500 Peshmerga reached the ridgeline; only running into token resistance, they seized their sector of the ridgeline. ODAs 394 and 395 began suppressing the defenders of Objective Stone, after a scheduled airstrike failed to soften up the Iraqi defenses, causing the Peshmerga to initially refuse to attack the objective, the two ODAs were engaged by Iraqi heavy machine guns and 120mm mortar fire. The ODAs managed to call in additional CAS which covered the withdrawal of the fire support ODAs out of mortar range and finally suppressed the majority of Objective Stone's defenders, ODAs 394 and 395 quickly resupplied on ammunition and returned to the battle. However, the ODAs were not in place when ODA 043 convinced the Peshmerga to advance again, but the Peshmerga advanced and captured the hilltop objective.

To the South, ODAs 044, 391, and 392 ran into dirt berms that the Iraqis had built across the road leading to Objective Rock, scattering mines over the roadway, whilst the Peshmerga attempted to clear the mines, the ODAs bypassed the roadblock. As the teams crested the ridge they engaged Iraqi infantry in prepared positions and bunkers who soon surrendered under the firepower of the GMVs; an Iraqi Colonel who was taken prisoner said that an Iraqi Army armored unit that was supporting them had withdrawn south. The ODAs returned to breach the dirt berm on the road behind them with demolition charges in case of a hasty retreat was required and moved up onto a small hill known as Press Hill, obscuring an approach to the crossroads from the south. The ODAs then advanced down to the Debecka crossroads themselves, at the edge of Debecka, ODA 392 pursued several Iraqi light mortar teams until it was engaged at long range by ZSU-57-2, whilst ODA 391 destroyed several trucks and technicals from Debecka with its Javelin anti-tank missiles and .50 caliber heavy machine guns. 

Soon after, the ODAs spotted a number of Iraqi MT-LB tracked armored personnel carriers appear out of the haze - advancing cautiously toward the crossroads and using their smoke generators to lay down a smoke screen behind them. The Green Berets attempted to suppress and halt them with .50 caliber machine gun and MK19 grenade launchers, they needed to buy themselves time to call in airstrikes and to cool down the Command Launch Units of their Javelins. At that moment, four Iraqi T-55 tanks appeared from behind the MT-LBs, firing their 100mm guns directly at the Green Berets, the ODAs mounted their GMVs and pulled back to a ridgeline some 900m from the crossroads which they dubbed their "Alamo", the Green Berets continued to ask for air support only to be told it would take a further 30 minutes to arrive on-station. The ODAs Javelin units were finally ready and began destroying the MT-LBs, however, they were running low on missiles. The sudden onslaught of missiles temporarily halted the Iraqi attack. The T-55s used a dirt berm to approach the crossroads slowly, effectively shielding them from the "lock on" of a Javelin; finally - some 35 minutes after the initial request was made two U.S. Navy F-14 Tomcats arrived. 

Despite being directed onto the T-55s, the first GBU-16 (1000LB) bomb landed among friendly forces, including a Green Beret AOB (Advanced Operational Base) at Objective Rock. The F-14 pilot got confused and targeted an old rusting hulk of a similar T-55 at Objective Rock rather than the four engaging the ODAs. The bomb killed 18 Peshmerga and wounded 45 along with 4 AOB Green Berets and a BBC camera crew accompanying the Peshmerga (one of them was journalist John Simpson), half of ODA 391 immediately drove to the scene and began treating casualties. 

The rest of the Green Berets were forced to pull back from the "Alamo" to Press Hill as Iraqi artillery began to bracket them, one of the Green Berets managed to destroy one T-55 that broke cover and attempted to advance toward them, finally a pair of US Navy F/A-18s arrived and drove off the remaining tanks with several bombs, ending the battle.
SSG Jason Brown (ODA 391) SGT Jeff Adamec (ODA 392) and SSG Eric Strigotte (ODA 044) all were awarded Silver Star Medals for their actions during the battle.

References

2. Lowery, Nathan S., "The Battle for Debecka Crossroads", Tip of the Spear, Winter 2005

Further reading
Roughneck Nine-One by Sgt.1st Class Frank Antenori and Hans Halberstradt, St.Martins Press New York, Copyright 2006

External links

The Battle of Debecka Pass: Roughnecks at War by John D. Gresham, Defense Media Network, 12 April 2010
Special Operations Troops Recount Iraq Missions by Gerry J. Gilmore, American Forces Press Service, 5 February 2004
The Battle of Debecka Pass Iraq, Raytheon Company website, Special Interest Stories

Battles of the Iraq War involving the United States
Battles of the Iraq War involving Iraq
Battles of the Iraq War in 2003
April 2003 events in Iraq